The DC Comics comic book series Starman (vol. 2) featured several story arcs over the course of 82 issues and two Annuals, plus a few spin-off stories as well.

Credits
All issues are written by James Robinson.

Issues #1–47 are pencilled by Tony Harris and inked by Wade Von Grawbadger unless otherwise noted.

Issues #50–80 are pencilled by Peter Snejbjerg unless otherwise noted.

Issues #48–60 are inked by Keith Champagne and issues #61–80 are inked by Peter Snejbjerg unless otherwise noted.

All issues are colored by Gregory Wright unless otherwise noted.

Issues #1–9 are lettered by John Workman.

Issues #12–80 are lettered by Bill Oakley unless otherwise noted.

Issues #1–16 and 20–44 are edited by Archie Goodwin and Chuck Kim.

Issues #17–19 are edited by Archie Goodwin only.

Issues #45–47 edited by Chuck Kim and Peter Tomasi.

Issues #48–56, 75–76, and 78–80 are edited by Peter Tomasi only.

Issues #57–74 are edited by Peter Tomasi and L. A. Williams.

Issues #77 and 80 are edited by Peter Tomasi and Stephen Wacker.

Main series

"Sins of the Father" (#0–3)
Synopsis: The Mist assaults Opal City, prompting Jack Knight to reluctantly take up the mantle of Starman to stop him.

"A Day in the Opal" (#4)
Synopsis: Jack receives two visitors at his antiques shop.

"Talking with David '95" (#5)
Synopsis: the first of a series of annual encounters between Jack and his dead brother, David Knight.

"1882: Back Stage, Back Then" (#6)
Synopsis: the first of the "Times Past" stories; this one recounts how the Shade moved to Opal City. 
This issue was pencilled by Kim Hagen, Bjarne Hansen, Christian Hojgaard, and Teddy H. Kristiansen; inked by Kristiansen; colored by Gregory Wright; and lettered by Ken Bruzenak, Bob Pinaha, and John Workman, Jr.

"A (K)night at the Circus" (#7–8)
Synopsis: Jack discovers Mikaal Tomas, enslaved at a circus freak show.

"Shards" (#9)
Synopsis: a transitional issue, covering many small events that set the stage for things to come.

"The Day Before the Day to Come" (#10)
Synopsis: as the new Mist prepares for her attack on the Opal, Jack befriends Solomon Grundy.

"13 Years Ago: Five Friends" (#11)
Synopsis: the second "Times Past" story recounts the final encounter between Ted Knight and the Rag Doll.
This issue was drawn by Matthew Dow Smith; colored by Gregory Wright; and lettered by Gaspar Saladino.

"Sins of the Child" (#12–16)
Synopsis: the new Mist assaults Opal City and various heroes emerge from the chaos.

Issue #14 was pencilled by Amanda Conner, Tommy Lee Edwards, Gary Erskine, Tony Harris, Stuart Immonen, Andrew Robinson, and Chris Sprouse; and inked by Gary Erskine and Wade Von Grawbadger.

Issues #15–16 were colored by Ted McKeever.

"Encounters" (#17)
Synopsis: Jack ends one relationship and begins another; the Shade and the O'Dares fight a demon, and Matt O'Dare gets trapped in a magical painting.

"First Joust" (#18)
Synopsis: the third "Times Past" story recounts the first encounter between Ted Knight and the original Mist.

"Talking with David '96" (#19)
Synopsis: the second "Talking with David" story takes place on board a pirate ship.

"Sand and Stars" (#20–24)
Synopsis: Jack has an adventure with Wesley Dodds, the Golden Age Sandman.

Issue #22 was pencilled by Guy Davis and Tony Harris; inked by Davis and Wade Von Grawbadger; and colored by David J. Hornung and Trish Mulvihill.

Issue #23 was colored by Kevin Somers.

Issue #24 was pencilled by Tony Harris and Chris Sprouse; and inked by Ray Snyder and Wade Von Grawbadger.

"Hell and Back" (#24–26)
Synopsis: Jack and the Shade enter the magic painting to rescue Matt O'Dare and bring back more than they bargained for.

Issue #26 was pencilled by Gary Erskine, Tony Harris, and J.H. Williams III; and inked by Erskine, Mick Gray, and Wade Von Grawbadger.

"Christmas Knight" (#27)
Synopsis: it is Christmas at the O'Dare household.
This issue was colored by Patrick Garrahy.

"1976: Super Freaks and Backstabbers" (#28)
Synopsis: the fourth "Times Past" story explains the backstory of Mikaal Tomas. 
This issue was pencilled by Craig T. Hamilton and inked by Ray Snyder.

"The Return of Bobo" (#29)
Synopsis: a bank robber is released from prison and finds a new life in the Opal. This issue also includes an entry of "The Shade's Journal" that summarizes the current state of affairs in Opal City.

"Infernal Devices" (#30–33)
Synopsis: Jack and a pirate ghost confront the mad bomber, Mr. Pip. Jack, Alan Scott, and Batman enter Grundy's mind to save his life.

Issue #30 was colored by Trish Mulvihill.

Issue #31 was inked by Ray Snyder and Wade Von Grawbadger.

Issue #33 was pencilled by Tony Harris and Mark Buckingham; inked by Wade Von Grawbadger; and colored by Michael Wright.

"Merry Pranksters" (#34)
Synopsis: the fate of Solomon Grundy.
This issue was pencilled by Mark Buckingham and Steve Yeowell; inked by Wayne Faucher, Wade Von Grawbadger, and Steve Yeowell; and colored by Michael Wright.

"Mr. Pip and Mr. Black" (#35)
Synopsis: the final confrontation with Mr. Pip. 
This issue was pencilled by Tony Harris and Steve Yeowell.

This issue ties into the crossover event Genesis.

"1990: A Hero Once...Despite Himself" (#36)
Synopsis: the fifth "Times Past" story explains who Will Payton is. 
This issue was pencilled by Richard Pace; inked by Wade Von Grawbadger; and colored by John Kalisz.

"Talking with David '97" (#37)
Synopsis: the third "Talking with David" story is a dinner party with a cast of dead heroes from the Golden Age.

"...La Fraternite De Justice Et Libere!" (#38)
Synopsis: the new Mist vs. the Justice League Europe. 
This issue was pencilled by Dusty Abell; inked by Norman Lee and Dexter Vines; and colored by Noelle C. Giddings.

"Lightning and Stars" (#39, The Power of Shazam! (vol. 2) #35, #40 and The Power of Shazam! (vol. 2) #36)
Synopsis: Bulletman is accused of being a Nazi spy, leading to a team-up between Jack Knight and Captain Marvel.
 
Issue #40 was inked by Ray Snyder and Wade Von Grawbadger.

The Power of Shazam! (vol. 2) #35–36 was written by Jerry Ordway; pencilled by Peter Krause; inked by Dick Giordano; colored by Glenn Whitmore; lettered by John Costanza; and edited by Mike Carlin.

"Villain's Redemption" (#41)
Synopsis: the Shade and Matt O'Dare set out to remove all evidence of Matt's past wrongdoings so that he can make a fresh start.
This issue was drawn by Gary Eyskine.

"1944: Science and Sorcery" (#42)
Synopsis: the sixth "Times Past" story describes an encounter between Ted Knight and Etrigan the Demon.
This issue was pencilled by Matthew Dow Smith.

"Knight's Past" (#43)
Synopsis: Jack opens his new antiques store and begins his quest to find Will Payton. 
This issue was pencilled by Mike Mayhew and lettered by Kurt Hathaway.

"1943: Things That Go Bump in the Night" (#44)
Synopsis: the seventh "Times Past" story introduces Sandra Knight, the original Phantom Lady.

"Destiny" (#45)
Synopsis: Jack leaves for the stars.

"Good Men and Bad: 1952" (#46)
Synopsis: the eighth "Times Past" story recounts team-ups between Ted Knight and the Jester and between Bobo Benneti and the Shade.
This issue was drawn and colored by Gene Ha.

"City Without Light (A Prelude to Bad Times)" (#47)
Synopsis: shows the Opal as it adapts to Jack's absence.
This issue was pencilled by Steve Yeowell.

"Stars My Destination" (#48–60)
Synopsis: Jack and Mikaal travel to space in search of Will Payton, and discover a link between him and another alien Starman, Prince Gavyn of Throneworld. 
This story arc was co-written by James Robinson and David S. Goyer.

Issues #48–49 were pencilled by Steve Yeowell. Issue #49 was inked by Yeowell.

Issue #50 was inked by Champagne and Wade Von Grawbadger; and colored by John Kalisz.

Issue #54 was pencilled, colored, and lettered by Craig T. Hamilton; and inked by Ray Snyder.

Issue #55 was pencilled by John McCrea, Peter Snejbjerg, and Chris Weston.

Issue #56 was pencilled by Stephen Sadowski and Peter Snejbjerg.

Issue #57 was colored by Jason Wright.

Issue #59 was colored by Allen Jamison and Gregory Wright.

"Grand Guignol" (#61–73)
Synopsis: many villains are brought together by a shadowy mastermind who is bent on destroying both Opal City and the Shade.

Issue #69 was pencilled and inked by Paul Smith and Peter Snejbjerg.

"1899, The Scalphunter Years: His Death and the Dying of It" (#74)
Synopsis: the final "Times Past" story recounts the final days of Scalphunter. 
This issue was drawn by Russ Heath.

"Sons and their Fathers" (#75)
Synopsis: Jack meets Superman.

"Talking with David (and Ted)" (#76)
Synopsis: the final "Talking with David" story.

"1951" (#77–79)
Synopsis: Jack finds himself in 1951, where he meets the Starman of that year. 
This story arc was co-written by James Robinson and David S. Goyer.

"Arrivederci, Bon Voyage, Goodbye" (#80)
Synopsis: Jack says his goodbyes and leaves the Starman identity and Opal City behind.

Annuals

"Legends of the Dead Earth" (Starman Annual #1 (1996))

"Stars in my Eyes" (Starman Annual #2 (1997))

Specials and tie-ins

The Shade #1-4 (April–July 1997)

Published April–July 1997, this four-issue miniseries follows the history of the Shade from 1838 to the present. Each issue was illustrated by different artists, with Pat Garrahy providing colors (issues #2-4) and Chris Eliopoulos providing letters for all four issues. Issue #1, "A Family Affair, Piers: 1838", was full illustrated by Gene Ha. Issue #2, "Rupert and Marguerite: 1865 & 1931", was illustrated by J. H. Williams III and Mick Gray. Issue #3, "The Spider: 1951", was illustrated by Bret Blevins, and issue #4, "Finale, Craig: 1997", was illustrated by Michael Zulli. The entire miniseries was collected in both Starman Omnibus Volume 3.
 and Starman: The Cosmic Omnibus Volume 1.

Starman: Secret Files and Origins #1 (April 1998)

Starman: The Mist #1 (June 1998)
Published in June 1998, this one-shot tie-in to DC's Girlfrenzy! event was pencilled by John Lucas; inked by Richard Case; colored by Pat Garrahy; and lettered by Bill Oakley.

Starman (vol. 2) #1,000,000 (November 1998)

Published between Starman (vol. 2) #47-48, this one-shot tie-in to DC One Million was pencilled by Peter Snejbjerg; inked by Wade Von Grawbadger; colored by Gregory Wright; lettered by Bill Oakley; and edited by Peter Tomasi.

Starman 80-Page Giant #1 (January 1999)
This entire issue was colored by Carla Feeny; lettered by Kurt Hathaway; and edited by Peter Tomasi.

Batman/Hellboy/Starman #1-2 (January–February 1999)

Starman (vol. 2) #81 (March 2010)
In March 2010, DC published a single issue continuation of Starman (vol. 2) as part of a revival of ended series during the crossover event Blackest Night. Starman (vol. 2) #81 was written by James Robinson; pencilled by Fernando Dagnino and Bill Sienkiewicz; inked by Sienkiewicz; colored by Matt Hollingsworth; and lettered by John J. Hill.

This issue did not feature Jack Knight, but rather focused on a romantic relationship between the Shade and Hope O'Dare and a resurrected David Knight becoming a Black Lantern.

References

Lists of comic book story arcs
Starman (DC Comics)